Rudra Narain Jha (1925-1971) was an Indian politician. He was a Member of Parliament, representing Bihar in the Rajya Sabha, the upper house of India's Parliament, as a member of the Samyukta Socialist Party.

References

Rajya Sabha members from Bihar
Samyukta Socialist Party politicians
1925 births
1971 deaths